The men's triple jump event at the 1975 Summer Universiade was held at the Stadio Olimpico in Rome with the final on 20 September.

Medalists

Results

Qualification

Final

References

Athletics at the 1975 Summer Universiade
1975